Malacoscylus is a genus of longhorn beetles of the subfamily Lamiinae, containing the following species:

 Malacoscylus auricomus Bates, 1881
 Malacoscylus cinctulus Bates, 1881
 Malacoscylus cirratus (Germar, 1824)
 Malacoscylus elegantulus Galileo & Martins, 2005
 Malacoscylus fasciatus Galileo & Martins, 1998
 Malacoscylus gonostigma Bates, 1881
 Malacoscylus gratiosus Bates, 1881
 Malacoscylus lacordairei (Thomson, 1868)
 Malacoscylus lanei Martins & Galileo, 1991
 Malacoscylus niger Aurivillius, 1908
 Malacoscylus xanthotaenius (Bates, 1881)

References

Hemilophini